Mowlem, also Mowlam, is a surname. Notable people with the surname include:

Mowlem
Arthur Rainsford Mowlem (1902–1986), New Zealand-born British plastic surgeon
John Mowlem (1788–1868), British stonemason and builder
John Mowlem (rugby union) (1870–1951), New Zealand rugby union player
Johnny Mowlem (born 1969), British racing driver

Mowlam
Mo Mowlam (1949–2005), English politician
Stephen Mowlam (born 1976), Australian hockey player